Pontedassio ( or ) is a comune (municipality) in the Province of Imperia in the Italian region Liguria.

Pontedassio borders the following municipalities: Chiusanico, Chiusavecchia, Diano Arentino, Imperia, Lucinasco, and Vasia.

Demographic evolution

References

Cities and towns in Liguria